Fini can refer to:

Gianfranco Fini, Italian politician
Michele Fini, Italian footballer
Leonor Fini, Argentine artist
Fini, a Brazilian candy company
795 Fini, a minor planet
Tapu Fini, a Gen VII Water/Fairy-type Pokémon species introduced in Pokémon Sun and Moon.